Libertarian theories of law build upon classical liberal and individualist doctrines.

The defining characteristics of libertarian legal theory are its insistence that the amount of governmental intervention should be kept to a minimum and the primary functions of law should be enforcement of contracts and social order, though social order is often seen as a desirable side effect of a free market rather than a philosophical necessity.

Historically, the Austrian economist Friedrich Hayek is the most important libertarian legal theorist. Another important predecessor was Lysander Spooner, a 19th-century American individualist anarchist and lawyer. John Locke was also an influence on libertarian legal theory (see Two Treatises of Government).

Ideas range from anarcho-capitalism to a minimal state providing physical protection and enforcement of contracts. Some advocate regulation, including the existence of a police force, military, public land and public infrastructure. Geolibertarians oppose absolute ownership of land on Georgist grounds.

Notable theorists 
Authors discussing libertarian legal theory include:
 Randy Barnett (The Structure of Liberty)
 Frédéric Bastiat (The Law)
 Bruce L. Benson (The Enterprise of Law: Justice Without the State)
 Frank van Dun (The Fundamental Principle of Law)
 Richard Epstein (Skepticism and Freedom)
 David Friedman (The Machinery of Freedom)
 Friedrich Hayek (Law, Legislation and Liberty)
 Gene Healy
 Hans Hermann Hoppe (The Economics and Ethics of Private Property)
 Stephan Kinsella (Law in a Libertarian World: Legal Foundations of a Free Society)
 Bruno Leoni (Freedom and the Law)
 Robert P. Murphy (Chaos Theory)
 Andrew Napolitano
 Robert Nozick (Anarchy, State, and Utopia)
 Roger Pilon
 Ayn Rand (Capitalism: The Unknown Ideal)
 Murray Rothbard (The Ethics of Liberty)
 Bernard Siegan (Economic Liberties and the Constitution)
 Lysander Spooner (The Unconstitutionality of Slavery)
 Linda and Morris Tannehill (The Market for Liberty)

See also 

 Constitutional economics
 Equality before the law
 
 Judicial activism
 Law and economics
 Outline of libertarianism
 Philosophy of law
 Polycentric law
 Rule according to higher law

References 
 Randy Barnett (1998). The Structure of Liberty: Justice and the Rule of Law. Oxford: Clarendon Press. .
 Richard Epstein (2003). Skepticism and Freedom: A Modern Case for Classical Liberalism. Chicago: University of Chicago Press. .
 Friedrich Hayek (1981). Law, Legislation and Liberty: The Political Order of a Free People. Chicago: University of Chicago Press. , .

External links 
 "The Structure of Liberty"
 "Legal Theory Lexicon: Libertarian Theories of Law"

Classical liberalism
Theories of law
Law